Bornella pele is a species of nudibranch in the family Bornellidae. It is found in waters off Hawaiʻi, Australia, Japan, French Polynesia, and Réunion. The species epithet derives from Pele, the Hawaiian god of volcanoes, due to the nudibranch's red markings.

Description
It is long and slug-like in shape.

The body is translucent white and speckled with opaque white spots. There are red streaks along the processes of the back and sides, from the oral tentacles to the base of the rhinopore sheaths, on the cerata and the inner side of the rhinphore sheaths.

References

External links
 

Marine fauna of Australia
Bornellidae
Taxa described in 2009